TSID may mean:

transmitting subscriber identification when sending faxes.
MPEG Transport Stream identifier